The Government Degree College Baramulla is a [University Grants Commission] autonomous college in Baramulla City  in the Indian union territory of Jammu and Kashmir.  It is an autonomous college recognised by UGC and is affiliated with the University of Kashmir.  The college has been awarded a grade "A++" rating by the NAAC. Also this college has CPE Status, College for potential and excellence.

Location 
The college is located in the lap of a hillock, four km from the city center  (Baramulla) on the Srinagar-Baramulla National Highway(NH-44)  It was established in 1943. It is situated at a distance of about 51 km from the state summer capital, Srinagar.

Overview & History 

The Boys Degree College at Baramulla was established as an English medium primary school, founded by the Catholic Missionaries at Baramulla, by Father Ignatius Brower and Rev. Father Simmons in 1905.  It was upgraded to a high school in 1913. In 1938 the school was upgraded to the status of Intermediate College.

It was upgraded to a Degree College in 1943, and was affiliated with the Punjab University at Lahore.  After the Independence of India in August 1947, the college was closed 27 October that year (after Pakistani rebels attacked Kashmir).

Boys Degree college Baramulla was re-opened 28 June 1954 as an Intermediate college, and was affiliated to the then University of Jammu and Kashmir.  Further upgraded to a Degree college in 1956, it was subsequently taken over by the State government on 1 April 1963.  It is currently affiliated with the university of Kashmir, and recognised by the University Grants Commission under the UGC Act 1956. Government Degree College Baramulla is the first institute of Jammu and Kashmir State to start undergraduate course in Mass Communication in 2002. It offers two degree course in Mass Communication viz. BMMMC and MCVP which has changed the media landscape of Kashmir in substantial ways having strong alumni working in various local, national and international media units.

Allama Rumi (R.A.) library is the central library of the college. The library is one of the best libraries of the J&K with all the modern facilities required to supplement the academic requirements of the students, teachers and staff. The library is housed in centrally located spacious well maintained building with ample light and fresh air. LIBRARY AUTOMATION The library is one of the first automated libraries of the J&K being automated in 2013 using SOUL 2.0. The library automation was further enriched through use of modern KOHA software and RFID technology. The college is among the first colleges of the north India to enable RFID technology in library automation. Taking clue from the library all other colleges of the state started implementing the same technology in their libraries for which special grants were made available by Higher Education department. The Important components of RFID technology are:

Self-Check in/ check out station: The station allows patrons to issue / return books without any human interface. the student has to place his RFID chip based and issue / return on the system. Book Drop: The system allows the patrons to return books just by dropping in the system automatically and receive a printed Receipt. Hand Held Scanner: The handheld device scans the RFID book tags within minutes thus helps in locating books, shelf rectification and stock control. Security Gate: The RFID gate ensures that no one takes the book without properly issuing on his account from the library. OPACS (Online Public Access Catalogue System): The two systems provide access and location of books to students within seconds. the patrons can search the collection of the library through title, author, subject etc. CCTV Surveillance: The library is secured through high end CCTV cameras monitoring

Courses offered 
The college offers bachelor's general courses in science, humanities, and business studies. Besides bachelor's courses, the college also offers postgraduate courses in mathematics and master's degrees in computer applications certified by the University of Kashmir.

Bachelor Courses 
 Bachelor of Arts in Multi Media and Mass Communication (BMMMC) formerly called as MCMP (Honours Degree).
 Bachelor of Arts with Mass Communication and Video Production (MCVP) as one of the subject.
 Bachelor of Arts
 Bachelor of Science (Medical)
 Bachelor of Science (Non Medical)
 Bachelor of Science (Electronics)
 Bachelor of Science (Information Technology)
 Bachelor of Science (Bio Technology)
 Bachelor of Commerce (B.Com.)
 Bachelor of business administration (Bba)
 Bachelor of Computer Application (BCA)

Master Courses 

 Master's degree in Mathematics
 Master's degree in Computer Applications

References 

Degree colleges in Kashmir Division
Universities and colleges in Jammu and Kashmir
Colleges affiliated to University of Kashmir
1943 establishments in India
Educational institutions established in 1943